The 1974 California gubernatorial election took place on November 5, 1974. The primary elections occurred on June 4, 1974. Incumbent Governor and former actor Ronald Reagan was retiring after two terms. Democratic Secretary of State Jerry Brown, son of former Governor Pat Brown, defeated Republican Controller Houston I. Flournoy in the general election. This is the first election since 1958 to not feature a Republican candidate that went on to become a U.S. president. With Brown’s election, California had a Democratic Governor and two Democratic Senators (John V. Tunney and Alan Cranston) for the first time since the Civil War.

Election background
For the first time since 1958, the incumbent governor of California (in this case, Ronald Reagan) was not running for reelection in either the primary or general election. This led to a pair of hotly contested primary elections. On the Republican side, 8 year Lieutenant Governor Edwin Reinecke ran against State Controller Houston I. Flournoy. The moderate Flournoy won a surprisingly easy victory over the more conservative Reinecke. On the Democratic side, there were numerous contenders for the nomination, including Secretary of State (and son of former Governor Pat Brown) Jerry Brown, Assembly Speaker Bob Moretti, and the mayor of San Francisco, Joseph Alioto. Brown ultimately won the primary, easily outdistancing his nearest rival Alioto.

Brown had the statewide name recognition, benefited from the fact Democrats outnumbered Republicans in California,  and maintained a lead in most of the early polls. Flournoy began to gain in the polls as the election approached, but Brown won, although by a much smaller margin than predicted. Coincidentally, when Brown ran for Secretary of State four years earlier, he defeated a man named James Flournoy – no relation to Houston – in a very close election.

Primary results

Democratic

Republican

Peace and Freedom Party

General election results

Results by county

References

California
Gubernatorial
1974
November 1974 events in the United States
Jerry Brown